The 2013–14 season was the 67th season in Osijek’s history and their twenty-third in the Prva HNL.

Competitions

Overall

Results and fixtures

Legend

Prva HNL

Croatian Cup

References 

2013-14
Croatian football clubs 2013–14 season